Milu may refer to:

People
Milú (Maria de Lourdes de Almeida Lemos) (1926–2008), Portuguese actress and singer
miLù German singer who has worked with Schiller (band)

Other uses
Milü, an approximation for pi by Zu Chongzhi
Milu (mythology), the ruler of Lua-o-Milu, the underworld
Père David's Deer, milu or elaphure, Elaphurus davidianus, a Chinese species of deer known only in captivity
Milu, Iran, a village in Hormozgan Province, Iran

See also
Snowy (character) (Milou in French), fictional character of Les Aventures de Tintin comic strip series
Miru (disambiguation)